Peter Vander Pyl (9 November 1933 – 25 April 2019) was a Canadian field hockey player. He competed in the men's tournament at the 1964 Summer Olympics.

References

External links
 

1933 births
2019 deaths
Canadian male field hockey players
Dutch emigrants to Canada
Olympic field hockey players of Canada
Field hockey players at the 1964 Summer Olympics
Place of birth missing